The 2nd Curtis Trophy was a motor race, run to Formula One rules, held on 5 June 1954 at Snetterton Circuit, Norfolk. The race was run over 10 laps of the circuit, and was won by British driver Roy Salvadori in a Maserati 250F, who also set fastest lap. Bill Whitehouse in a Connaught Type A-Lea Francis and Jimmy Somervail in a Cooper T20-Bristol were second and third.

Results

References

Curtis
Curtis